Cosrou is a coastal village in southern Ivory Coast. It is in the sub-prefecture of Toupah, Dabou Department, Grands-Ponts Region, Lagunes District. The area is dominated by about 3500 hectares of savanna and plantations.

Cosrou was a commune until March 2012, when it became one of 1126 communes nationwide that were abolished. J. L. Tournier was chief of the commune (cercle) in the mid to late 1940s.

Notes

Former communes of Ivory Coast
Populated places in Lagunes District
Populated places in Grands-Ponts